This is a list of Réseau Express Régional (RER) stations for the regional rapid transit system of Île-de-France, France.

Key to symbols

  Transport express régional (regional trains other than RER)
  TGV (high-speed long-distance trains)
  Transilien (regional trains other than RER)
  Nord
  Saint-Lazare
  Montparnasse
  Est
  Lyon
  RER
  RER A
  RER B
  RER C
  RER D
  RER E
  Paris Métro
  Tramways in Île-de-France
  Bus (RATP)
  Noctilien
  Bus (other than RATP)
  Orlyval

Stations

See also 

 List of Paris Métro stations
 List of Transilien stations
 List of Paris railway stations
 List of tram stops in Île-de-France

External links 

 RATP – Map of the RER
 Transilien – Journey planner and time table of the RER
 RATP – Journey planner of RATP (all Stations - English web site)

 List of RER stations
Paris RER
Railway stations (RER)